Dysauxes is a genus of moths in the family Erebidae. The genus was erected by Jacob Hübner in 1819.

Species
Subgenus Dysauxes
Dysauxes ancilla (Linnaeus, 1767)
Dysauxes famula (Freyer, 1836)
Dysauxes fraterna Ignatyev & Zolotuhin, 2006
Dysauxes kaschmiriensis Rothschild, 1910
Dysauxes parvigutta (Christoph, 1889)
Dysauxes syntomida (Staudinger, 1892)
Subgenus Adauctis Ignatyev & Zolotuhin, 2006
Dysauxes punctata (Fabricius, 1781)
Dysauxes servula (Berce, 1862)

References

Ignatyev, N. N. & Zolotuhin, V. V. (2006). "A review of syntomids (Lepidoptera: Syntomidae) of Russia and adjacent territories. Part 2. Genus Dysauxes Hübner, 1826". Eversmannia. 6: 27–49.
Witt, T. J. & Ronkay, L. (2011). "Lymantriinae and Arctiinae - Including Phylogeny and Check List of the Quadrifid Noctuoidea of Europe". Noctuidae Europaeae. 13: 1–448.

External links

Syntomini
Moth genera